SongBird is a Dutch sub label owned by Tijs Verwest and Arny Bink. It is a sub label of Black Hole Recordings, established in 1997, and is most well known as the label on which Tiësto's popular trance series, In Search of Sunrise, was released.

Artists

 Alkatraz
 Andy Duguid
 Andy Moor
 Avis Vox
 Azotti
 BT
 Ben Preston
 Clear View
 Donna Fargo
 Cary Brothers
 Cor Fijneman
 Deadmau5
 Giuseppe Ottaviani
 George Acosta
 Jason van Wyk
 Jes Brieden
 Emilio Fernandez
 Kimito Lopez
 Lange
 Markus Schulz
 Mark Norman
 Moonbeam
 Myon & Shane 54
 Orkidea
 Russel G.
 Richard Durand
 Somna
 Steve Forte Rio
 Tiësto

Catalog

Albums
 SONGBIRD CD 01 DJ Dazzle - Freedom: A Celebration of Life (CD)
 SONGBIRD CD 02 DJ Dazzle - Freedom 2: A Celebration of Life (CD)
 SONGBIRD CD 03 Tiësto - In Search of Sunrise (CD)
 SONGBIRD CD 04 DJ Dazzle - Freedom 3: The Norway Sessions (CD)
 SONGBIRD CD 05 Tiësto - In Search of Sunrise 2 (CD)
 SONGBIRD CD 06 DJ Dazzle - Freedom 4: Somewhere In Time (CD)
 SONGBIRD CD 07 Tiësto - In Search of Sunrise 3: Panama (CD)
 SONGBIRD CD 08 Tiësto - In Search of Sunrise 4: Latin America (2xCD)
 SONGBIRD CD 09 Tiësto - In Search of Sunrise 5: Los Angeles (2xCD)
 SONGBIRD CD 10 Tiësto - In Search of Sunrise 6: Ibiza (2xCD)
 SONGBIRD CD 11 Tiësto - In Search of Sunrise 7: Asia (2xCD)
 SONGBIRD CD 12 Richard Durand - In Search of Sunrise 8: South Africa (2xCD)
 SONGBIRD CD 13 Andy Duguid - Miracle Moments (2xCD)
 SONGBIRD CD 14 Pedro Del Mar - Mellomania 20 (2xCD)
 SONGBIRD CD 15 Richard Durand - In Search of Sunrise 9: India (2xCD)
 SONGBIRD CD 16 Pedro Del Mar - Mellomania 21 (2xCD)
 SONGBIRD CD 17 Richard Durand - In Search of Sunrise 10: Australia (2xCD)
 SONGBIRD CD 18 Pedro Del Mar - Mellomania 22 (2xCD)
 SONGBIRD CD 19 Richard Durand & Myon & Shane 54 - In Search of Sunrise 11: Las Vegas (3xCD)
 SONGBIRD CD 20 Pedro Del Mar - Mellomania 23 (2xCD)
 SONGBIRD CD 21 Richard Durand with Lange - In Search of Sunrise 12: Dubai (3xCD)
 SONGBIRD CD 22 Richard Durand with bt - In Search of Sunrise 13.5: Amsterdam (3xCD)

Forevermore digital only exclusive series
 SB DC 01 Forevermore, Vol. 1 Release Date: August 1, 2008
 SB DC 02 Forevermore, Vol. 2 Release Date: December 30, 2008
 SB DC 03 Forevermore, Vol. 3 Release Date: 2009
 SB DC 04 Forevermore, Vol. 4 Release Date: October 27, 2009
 SB DC 05 Forevermore, Vol. 5 Release Date: January 6, 2010
 SB DC 06 Forevermore, Vol. 6 Release Date: June 28, 2010
 SB DC 07 Forevermore, Vol. 7 Release Date: August 2, 2010
 SB DC 08 Forevermore, Vol. 8 Release Date: May 16, 2011

Vinyl

 SONGBIRD 201 Legato - Small Town Boy
 SONGBIRD 202 Mistral - Rhythm of Summer
 SONGBIRD 203 Moontribe - Dance of The Seventh Hill
 SONGBIRD 204 Mistral - In My Dreams
 SONGBIRD 205 Art of Trance - Breathe
 SONGBIRD 206 Nova Zembla - Nowhere To Go (The End of The Road)
 SONGBIRD 207 Moontribe - Encore
 SONGBIRD 208 Masai - One Vision
 SONGBIRD 209 DJ Dazzle - Freedom 4: Somewhere In Time
 SONGBIRD 210 LN Movement - Golden Desert
 SONGBIRD 210 Moonbeam - I Love Mornings
 SONGBIRD 211 Moonbeam - See The Difference Inside
 SONGBIRD 212 Russell G. - Dark Room
 SONGBIRD 213 Deadmau5 - Arguru
 SONGBIRD 214 Moonbeam - Seeming Reflection
 SONGBIRD 215 Clear View - Tell Me
 SONGBIRD 216 Moonbeam - 7 Seconds
 SONGBIRD 217 Steve Forte Rio - A New Dawn
 SONGBIRD 218 Emilio Fernandez - Let It Go
 SONGBIRD 219 Russell G. - Whiplash
 SONGBIRD 220 Cary Brothers - Ride
 SONGBIRD 221 Emilio Fernandez - Reynosa
 SONGBIRD 222 Russell G. - Lose It
 SONGBIRD 223 Deadmau5 - Clockwork
 SONGBIRD 224 Deadmau5 - Clockwork (Remixes)
 SONGBIRD 225 Cor Fijneman - Disappear
 SONGBIRD 226 Emilio Fernandez - Saltillo
 SONGBIRD 227 Ben Preston - Elizabeth
 SONGBIRD 228 Alkatraz - Rubble And Rust / The Hunted
 SONGBIRD 229 Russell G. - Every Which Way
 SONGBIRD 230 Kimito Lopez - There Is No Such Thing As Mermaids / Unicron
 SONGBIRD 231 Deadmau5 - Clockwork (Helvetic Nerds Remix)
 SONGBIRD 232 Alkatraz - Can't Go On
 SONGBIRD 233 Gustav - Gossip Girl
 SONGBIRD 234 Sunday Cinema - Models At Work
 SONGBIRD 235 Julius Beat - The Tunnel
 SONGBIRD 236 Ben Preston - Why We Run
 SONGBIRD 237 Kimito Lopez - Lost Souls / Monanza
 SONGBIRD 238 George Acosta - True Love
 SONGBIRD 239 Spartaque & Slava Flash - Openair
 SONGBIRD 240 Julius Beat & Eddy Karmona - Believes In Himself
 SONGBIRD 241 George Acosta - Tearing Me Apart
 SONGBIRD 242 Michael Angelo & Solo - Alone
 SONGBIRD 243 Steve Kaetzel - Black Opal
 SONGBIRD 244 Chris Domingo - Organica
 SONGBIRD 245 Steve Kaetzel - So Alone
 SONGBIRD 246 Future Disciple - Day Seeker
 SONGBIRD 247 Richard Durand & JES - N.Y.C.
 SONGBIRD 248 Matteo Marini - Next Day
 SONGBIRD 249 George Acosta - Beautiful
 SONGBIRD 250 Prayag & Rishab - Ashna
 SONGBIRD 251 D.E.R. & Julius Beat - Our Feeling
 SONGBIRD 252 Suspect 44 - Hold Me
 SONGBIRD 253 George Acosta - Love Rain Down
 SONGBIRD 254 Richard Durand & JES - N.Y.C. (Remixes)
 SONGBIRD 255 Avis Vox - Introspection Attempts
 SONGBIRD 256 George Acosta - Art Deco EP
 SONGBIRD 257 Deadmau5 - Arguru / Clockwork (Robbie Rivera Remixes)
 SONGBIRD 258 Ad Brown & Matt Lange - As The Rain Falls
 SONGBIRD 259 Triangle Sun - Beautiful
 SONGBIRD 260 
 SONGBIRD 261 Andy Duguid - Miracle Moments
 SONGBIRD 262 Andrew Salsano & JF Sebastian - Walking On Fire
 SONGBIRD 263 Suspect 44 - Theres No One
 SONGBIRD 264 Kaddyn Palmed - 4 U
 SONGBIRD 265 Sebastian Weikum - Doomed
 SONGBIRD 266 
 SONGBIRD 267 Steve Kaetzel - Floe / Aurora
 SONGBIRD 268 Marsbeing - Open Your Eyes
 SONGBIRD 269 Ben Preston - Pillars Of The Earth
 SONGBIRD 270 Audien - What Dreams May Come
 SONGBIRD 271 Shipstad & Warren - I'm Never Alone
 SONGBIRD 272 Ben Preston - Buried City
 SONGBIRD 273 
 SONGBIRD 274 Kostya Veter - Envy
 SONGBIRD 275 Gosh - Nova
 SONGBIRD 276 Electric Pulse - Under The Stars
 SONGBIRD 277 Mehilove - Reality Bites
 SONGBIRD 278 
 SONGBIRD 279 Zachary Zamarripa - Sassafras / Lies In Wait
 SONGBIRD 280 Sons Of Methuselah - Convolutions
 SONGBIRD 281 DJ Hashish - Fantasy / Starfish
 SONGBIRD 282 DJ Funkadelic & Beauriche - Subway
 SONGBIRD 283 Shipstad & Warren - Sex, Lies & Melody
 SONGBIRD 284 Soarsweep - Diffused Memories / Never Grow Up
 SONGBIRD 285 Andy Duguid - Miracle Moments (Remixes)
 SONGBIRD 286 George Acosta - True Love (Remixes)
 SONGBIRD 287 DJ Hashish - Heading North / The Sandcastle
 SONGBIRD 288 Gosh - Nova (Andrew Benson Remix)
 SONGBIRD 289 Sebastian Weikum - Adem
 SONGBIRD 290 Danny Dove & Ben Preston - Break Inside
 SONGBIRD 291 Future Disciple - Total Recall
 SONGBIRD 292 Michael Angello - Messa / Moments
 SONGBIRD 293 Andrew Benson & Gosh - Lost In Bermudas
 SONGBIRD 294 DJ Hashish - Lost / Profound
 SONGBIRD 295 Amex & Barlett Bros. - A New Dawn
 SONGBIRD 296 Santerna - Aquamarine / Parallax
 SONGBIRD 297 Ad Brown & Kerry Leva - Boxing Gloves
 SONGBIRD 298 Soarsweep - Hidden In The Cave / Feel No Pain
 SONGBIRD 299 Zachary Zamarripa - Calling
 SONGBIRD 300

 SONGBIRD 301 Moonpax - Ice Coffee
 SONGBIRD 302 Rene Martens - Point Of No Return
 SONGBIRD 303 DJ Hashish - Awakening / Oceanic
 SONGBIRD 304 Ad Brown & James Hockley - Summer Tide
 SONGBIRD 305 Santerna - Envision
 SONGBIRD 306 George Acosta - Never Fear
 SONGBIRD 307 Lost Stories - All Good Things
 SONGBIRD 308 Sunny Lax - Viva La Revolucion / Something Is Broken
 SONGBIRD 309 York - Reachers Of Civilization
 SONGBIRD 310 Future Disciple - Big Stones / Bright Tides
 SONGBIRD 311 Tastexperience - Control
 SONGBIRD 312 Nafis - My Way To You
 SONGBIRD 313 The Attic - Release Me
 SONGBIRD 314 Sons Of Methuselah - Mintaka
 SONGBIRD 315 Jorg Zimmer - Acamar / Sicily
 SONGBIRD 316 Future Disciple - Nail The Nile
 SONGBIRD 317 Jozhy K & Glittering Puzzle - Take My Breath Away
 SONGBIRD 318 Nuera feat. Szen - Stuck
 SONGBIRD 319 Somna & Vijo Caselle feat. Sarah-Jane Neild - Without You
 SONGBIRD 320 Spartaque & Slava Flash - Open Air
 SONGBIRD 321 George Acosta feat. Lizzie Curious - Like Home
 SONGBIRD 322 Nick Wax & Trenix present Eireann Wax - Here Tonight
 SONGBIRD 323 Rosie Romero &  Ben Malone feat. Taya - Close Your Eyes
 SONGBIRD 324 Aerofeel5 feat. Eva Kade - Friday Night
 SONGBIRD 325 Alkatraz - Tropea
 SONGBIRD 326 Nafis - Cappadocia
 SONGBIRD 327 Amurai - Valencia
 SONGBIRD 328 Lence & Pluton - Times Like This
 SONGBIRD 329 Marsbeing feat. Matvey Emerson - With Me
 SONGBIRD 330 Aeonism - Swirl / Twilight
 SONGBIRD 331 Marsbeing & MalYar - Walking To The Stars
 SONGBIRD 332 Sunny Lax - Maono EP
 SONGBIRD 333 Hayley Parsons - 7th Heaven
 SONGBIRD 334 Jason van Wyk - Winter
 SONGBIRD 335 Steve Kaetzel feat. Brianna Holan - Darling
 SONGBIRD 336 Jason van Wyk & JPL feat. Cat Martin - Every Mile Away
 SONGBIRD 337 Max Roelse & Two Killers feat. Ange - Heart Breaking
 SONGBIRD 338 Kiholm feat. Josh Money - Long Way Home
 SONGBIRD 339 Motif feat. Naemi Joy - One More Time
 SONGBIRD 340 Steve Kaetzel feat. Emma Lock - I Loved You
 SONGBIRD 341 Santerna - Diffraction
 SONGBIRD 342 Somna & Amos feat. Seri - The Life I Had Before (Remixes)
 SONGBIRD 343 Roy Malakian - Caroma
 SONGBIRD 344 Steve Brian & York - Unchain Your Soul
 SONGBIRD 345 The Destiny - Perpetuum Mobile
 SONGBIRD 346 Haugli feat. Lizzie Curious - Your Touch
 SONGBIRD 347 C-Systems feat. Hanna Finsen - Just Begun
 SONGBIRD 348 Noa Assembly - Into The Fire
 SONGBIRD 349 Conil - Malibu Beach
 SONGBIRD 350 Various Artists - In Search Of Sunrise 12 Dubai DJ Sampler Part 1
 SONGBIRD 351 Various Artists - In Search Of Sunrise 12 Dubai DJ Sampler Part 2
 SONGBIRD 352 Vinson - Circular Progression
 SONGBIRD 353 Azotti feat. Bagga Bownz - Day And Night
 SONGBIRD 354 Jeremy Vancaulart & Assaf feat. Laura Aqui - The Space Between
 SONGBIRD 354-1 Jeremy Vancaulart & Assaf feat. Laura Aqui - The Space Between (Cold Rush Remix)

Long Plays
 SONGBIRD LP 08 Tiësto - In Search of Sunrise 4: Latin America (2xLP, Ltd, Smplr)
 SONGBIRD LP 09 Tiësto - In Search of Sunrise 5: Los Angeles (2xLP, Ltd, Smplr) 
 SONGBIRD LP 10 Tiësto - In Search of Sunrise 6: Ibiza (2xLP, Ltd, Smplr) 
 SONGBIRD LP 11 Tiësto - In Search of Sunrise 7: Asia (2XLP, Ltd, Smplr)

Samplers
 SONGBIRD 10S1CD Tiësto - In Search of Sunrise 6: Ibiza (Sampler 1) (CDr, Smplr, Car) 
 SONGBIRD 10S2CD Tiësto - In Search of Sunrise 6: Ibiza (Sampler 2) (CDr, Smplr, Car) 
 SONGBIRD 10S3CD Tiësto - In Search of Sunrise 6: Ibiza (Sampler 3) (CDr, Smplr, Car) 
 MMCD10-D01 Tiësto - In Search of Sunrise 6 - Ibiza (Exclusive Beatport Sampler One) (File, MP3, Smplr) 
 MMCD10-D02 Tiësto - In Search of Sunrise 6 - Ibiza (Exclusive Beatport Sampler Two) (File, MP3, Smplr)

See also
 Black Hole Recordings
 In Search of Sunrise
 Tiësto
 List of record labels

References

Dutch record labels
Trance record labels
Record labels established in 1997
Electronic music record labels
Electronic dance music record labels